Mónica Rocío Alemán Mármol is a politician from Ecuador. She was elected to the National Assembly. She led the introduction of legislation to reduce domestic violence.

Life 

In 2017 she led the "Occasional Commission for violence against women" at the National Assembly. The commission drafted a new law "Comprehensive Organic Law to Prevent and Eradicate Violence Against Women".

In 2021 she was one of the National Assembly's supporters of Cuba in its dispute with the USA's trade sanctions. Before the elections in February, she requested unpaid leave from the assembly so that she could take part in the elections. 42 other members also made the same request including Wilma Andrade, Cristina Reyes, Dallyana Passailaigue and Verónica Arias. During her absence her job would be carried out by her substitute.

References 

Living people
Year of birth missing (living people)
21st-century Ecuadorian women politicians
21st-century Ecuadorian politicians
Members of the National Assembly (Ecuador)